The 1993–94 NBA season was the 48th season for the Knicks in the National Basketball Association in New York City. This marked the last season in which the Knicks (and all other MSG properties) were owned by Paramount Communications (formerly Gulf+Western), which was sold near the end of the season to Viacom, which in turn sold them to ITT Corporation and Cablevision. A couple of years later, ITT would sell their share to Cablevision. The Knicks'  owner, The Madison Square Garden Company, is a spin-off of Cablevision.

During the off-season, the Knicks signed free agent Anthony Bonner. The team got off to a fast start winning their first seven games. However, they would lose Doc Rivers for the remainder of the season to a knee injury after just 19 games, while Charles D. Smith and second-year guard Hubert Davis also missed parts of the season with injuries. At midseason, the Knicks traded Tony Campbell to the Dallas Mavericks in exchange for Derek Harper to fill in the void left by Rivers. Despite the injuries, the Knicks had another successful season holding a 34–14 record at the All-Star break, and then posting a 15-game winning streak late in the season, including a 14–0 record in March, finishing first place in the Atlantic Division with a 57–25 record. The Knicks earned the #2 seed in the Eastern Conference.

Patrick Ewing had a stellar season averaging 24.5 points, 11.2 rebounds and 2.7 blocks per game, and finished in fifth place in Most Valuable Player voting, but was not selected to an All-NBA Team at season's end. In addition, John Starks averaged 19.0 points, 5.9 assists and 1.6 steals per game, but only played 59 games due to a knee injury, which forced him to miss the rest of the regular season, while Charles Oakley provided the team with 11.8 points and rebounds per game each, contributed 1.3 steals per game, and was named to the NBA All-Defensive First Team. Davis contributed 11.0 points per game, while Smith provided with 10.4 points per game, and sixth man Anthony Mason averaged 7.2 points and 5.8 rebounds per game off the bench. Ewing, Starks and Oakley were all selected for the 1994 NBA All-Star Game.

In the Eastern Conference First Round of the playoffs, the Knicks defeated the New Jersey Nets in four games. In the Eastern Conference Semi-finals, they faced the Chicago Bulls for the fourth straight year. Michael Jordan had retired prior to the season to pursue a baseball career, and the team was now led by Scottie Pippen. The Knicks would defeat the Bulls in a full seven game series to advance to the Eastern Conference Finals, where they trailed 3–2 to Reggie Miller and the 5th-seeded Indiana Pacers, but managed to defeat them in another full seven game series. The Knicks advanced to the 1994 NBA Finals, and took a 3–2 series lead over regular season MVP, and Defensive Player of the Year Hakeem Olajuwon and the Houston Rockets, but lost the next two games, thus the series.

In the 1994 Playoffs, the Knicks set the record for most games allowing under 95 and under 100 points in one playoff run. Opponents were held to under 95 and 100 points in 23 and 24 games, respectively. Following the season, Rolando Blackman was released to free agency.

Draft picks

The Knicks had no draft picks in 1993.

Roster

Pre season

Game log

Regular season

Season standings

z – clinched division title
y – clinched division title
x – clinched playoff spot

Record vs. opponents

Game log

Regular season

|- align="center" bgcolor="#ccffcc"
| 1
| November 5, 1993
| @ Boston
| W 111–108
|
|
|
| Boston Garden
| 1–0
|- align="center" bgcolor="#ccffcc"
| 2
| November 7, 1993
| @ Cleveland
| W 115–107 (OT)
|
|
|
| Richfield Coliseum
| 2–0
|- align="center" bgcolor="#ccffcc"
| 3
| November 9, 1993
| Philadelphia
| W 95–86
|
|
|
| Madison Square Garden
| 3–0
|- align="center" bgcolor="#ccffcc"
| 4
| November 10, 1993
| @ Washington
| W 92–84
|
|
|
| USAir Arena
| 4–0
|- align="center" bgcolor="#ccffcc"
| 5
| November 12, 1993
| @ Indiana
| W 103–84
|
|
|
| Market Square Arena
| 5–0
|- align="center" bgcolor="#ccffcc"
| 6
| November 13, 1993
| Milwaukee
| W 99–86
|
|
|
| Madison Square Garden
| 6–0
|- align="center" bgcolor="#ccffcc"
| 7
| November 16, 1993
| @ Dallas
| W 103–90
|
|
|
| Reunion Arena
| 7–0
|- align="center" bgcolor="#ffcccc"
| 8
| November 17, 1993
| @ San Antonio
| L 90–95
|
|
|
| Alamodome
| 7–1
|- align="center" bgcolor="#ffcccc"
| 9
| November 20, 1993
| Utah
| L 72–86
|
|
|
| Madison Square Garden
| 7–2
|- align="center" bgcolor="#ccffcc"
| 10
| November 22, 1993
| Miami
| W 119–87
|
|
|
| Madison Square Garden
| 8–2
|- align="center" bgcolor="#ccffcc"
| 11
| November 27, 1993
| Detroit
| W 112–85
|
|
|
| Madison Square Garden
| 9–2

|- align="center" bgcolor="#ffcccc"
| 12
| December 2, 1993
| Houston
| L 85–94
|
|
|
| Madison Square Garden
| 9–3
|- align="center" bgcolor="#ccffcc"
| 13
| December 4, 1993
| Sacramento
| W 123–101
|
|
|
| Madison Square Garden
| 10–3
|- align="center" bgcolor="#ffcccc"
| 14
| December 6, 1993
| @ Utah
| L 96–103
|
|
|
| Delta Center
| 10–4
|- align="center" bgcolor="#ccffcc"
| 15
| December 7, 1993
| @ L.A. Lakers
| W 92–78
|
|
|
| Great Western Forum
| 11–4
|- align="center" bgcolor="#ccffcc"
| 16
| December 9, 1993
| @ Golden State
| W 94–81
|
|
|
| Oakland-Alameda County Coliseum Arena
| 12–4
|- align="center" bgcolor="#ccffcc"
| 17
| December 11, 1993
| Indiana
| W 98–91
|
|
|
| Madison Square Garden
| 13–4
|- align="center" bgcolor="#ccffcc"
| 18
| December 14, 1993
| Denver
| W 93–84
|
|
|
| Madison Square Garden
| 14–4
|- align="center" bgcolor="#ccffcc"
| 19
| December 16, 1993
| L.A. Lakers
| W 108–85
|
|
|
| Madison Square Garden
| 15–4
|- align="center" bgcolor="#ffcccc"
| 20
| December 17, 1993
| @ Chicago
| L 86–98
|
|
|
| Chicago Stadium
| 15–5
|- align="center" bgcolor="#ccffcc"
| 21
| December 20, 1993
| Dallas
| W 101–92
|
|
|
| Madison Square Garden
| 16–5
|- align="center" bgcolor="#ffcccc"
| 22
| December 21, 1993
| @ New Jersey
| L 81–85
|
|
|
| Brendan Byrne Arena
| 16–6
|- align="center" bgcolor="#ccffcc"
| 23
| December 23, 1993
| Atlanta
| W 84–75
|
|
|
| Madison Square Garden
| 17–6
|- align="center" bgcolor="#ffcccc"
| 24
| December 28, 1993
| New Jersey
| L 95–97
|
|
|
| Madison Square Garden
| 17–7
|- align="center" bgcolor="#ccffcc"
| 25
| December 30, 1993
| Washington
| W 102–84
|
|
|
| Madison Square Garden
| 18–7

|- align="center" bgcolor="#ffcccc"
| 26
| January 2, 1994
| Charlotte
| L 123–124 (OT)
|
|
|
| Madison Square Garden
| 18–8
|- align="center" bgcolor="#ccffcc"
| 27
| January 4, 1994
| Orlando
| W 100–95
|
|
|
| Madison Square Garden
| 19–8
|- align="center" bgcolor="#ccffcc"
| 28
| January 6, 1994
| @ Milwaukee
| W 92–86
|
|
|
| Bradley Center
| 19–9
|- align="center" bgcolor="#ffcccc"
| 29
| January 8, 1994
| @ Charlotte
| L 99–102
|
|
|
| Charlotte Coliseum
| 20–9
|- align="center" bgcolor="#ccffcc"
| 30
| January 9, 1994
| Portland
| W 99–85
|
|
|
| Madison Square Garden
| 21–9
|- align="center" bgcolor="#ccffcc"
| 31
| January 11, 1994
| L.A. Clippers
| W 98–77
|
|
|
| Madison Square Garden
| 22–9
|- align="center" bgcolor="#ccffcc"
| 32
| January 13, 1994
| @ Detroit
| W 94–80
|
|
|
| The Palace of Auburn Hills
| 23–9
|- align="center" bgcolor="#ccffcc"
| 33
| January 15, 1994
| Detroit
| W 97–88
|
|
|
| Madison Square Garden
| 24–9
|- align="center" bgcolor="#ccffcc"
| 34
| January 17, 1994
| Minnesota
| W 106–94
|
|
|
| Madison Square Garden
| 25–9
|- align="center" bgcolor="#ccffcc"
| 35
| January 19, 1994
| San Antonio
| W 120–108
|
|
|
| Madison Square Garden
| 26–9
|- align="center" bgcolor="#ffcccc"
| 36
| January 21, 1994
| @ Orlando
| L 103–106
|
|
|
| Orlando Arena
| 26–10
|- align="center" bgcolor="#ffcccc"
| 37
| January 23, 1994
| Philadelphia
| L 92–99
|
|
|
| Madison Square Garden
| 26–11
|- align="center" bgcolor="#ccffcc"
| 38
| January 25, 1994
| Phoenix
| W 98–96
|
|
|
| Madison Square Garden
| 27–11
|- align="center" bgcolor="#ccffcc"
| 39
| January 27, 1994
| @ L.A. Clippers
| W 103–102
|
|
|
| Aarowhead Pond of Anaheim
| 28–11
|- align="center" bgcolor="#ccffcc"
| 40
| January 29, 1994
| @ Seattle
| W 106–92
|
|
|
| Seattle Center Coliseum
| 29–11
|- align="center" bgcolor="#ccffcc"
| 41
| January 30, 1994
| @ Portland
| W 103–93
|
|
|
| Memorial Coliseum
| 30–11

|- align="center" bgcolor="#ccffcc"
| 42
| February 1, 1994
| Boston
| W 114–79
|
|
|
| Madison Square Garden
| 31–11
|- align="center" bgcolor="#ccffcc"
| 43
| February 2, 1994
| @ Washington
| W 85–80
|
|
|
| USAir Arena
| 32–11
|- align="center" bgcolor="#ffcccc"
| 44
| February 4, 1994
| @ Atlanta
| L 102–114
|
|
|
| The Omni
| 32–12
|- align="center" bgcolor="#ccffcc"
| 45
| February 6, 1994
| Orlando
| W 95–77
|
|
|
| Madison Square Garden
| 33–12
|- align="center" bgcolor="#ffcccc"
| 46
| February 7, 1994
| @ Miami
| L 85–96
|
|
|
| Miami Arena
| 33–13
|- align="center" bgcolor="#ccffcc"
| 47
| February 9, 1994
| @ Philadelphia
| W 114–79
|
|
|
| The Spectrum
| 34–13
|- align="center" bgcolor="#ffcccc"
| 48
| February 10, 1994
| Golden State
| L 105–113
|
|
|
| Madison Square Garden
| 34–14
|- align="center"
|colspan="9" bgcolor="#bbcaff"|All-Star Break
|- style="background:#cfc;"
|- bgcolor="#bbffbb"
|- align="center" bgcolor="#ffcccc"
| 49
| February 15, 1994
| @ New Jersey
| L 83–103
|
|
|
| Brendan Byrne Arena
| 34–15
|- align="center" bgcolor="#ccffcc"
| 50
| February 17, 1994
| @ Cleveland
| W 102–95
|
|
|
| Richfield Coliseum
| 35–15
|- align="center" bgcolor="#ccffcc"
| 51
| February 20, 1994
| Chicago
| W 86–68
|
|
|
| Madison Square Garden
| 36–15
|- align="center" bgcolor="#ffcccc"
| 52
| February 22, 1994
| Seattle
| L 82–93
|
|
|
| Madison Square Garden
| 36–16
|- align="center" bgcolor="#ffcccc"
| 53
| February 24, 1994
| @ Houston
| L 73–93
|
|
|
| The Summit
| 36–17
|- align="center" bgcolor="#ffcccc"
| 54
| February 25, 1994
| @ Denver
| L 94–102
|
|
|
| McNichols Sports Arena
| 36–18
|- align="center" bgcolor="#ffcccc"
| 55
| February 27, 1994
| @ Phoenix
| L 78–92
|
|
|
| America West Arena
| 36–19

|- align="center" bgcolor="#ccffcc"
| 56
| March 1, 1994
| @ Sacramento
| W 100–88
|
|
|
| ARCO Arena
| 37–19
|- align="center" bgcolor="#ccffcc"
| 57
| March 3, 1994
| New Jersey
| W 97–86
|
|
|
| Madison Square Garden
| 38–19
|- align="center" bgcolor="#ccffcc"
| 58
| March 7, 1994
| @ Detroit
| W 99–85
|
|
|
| The Palace of Auburn Hills
| 39–19
|- align="center" bgcolor="#ccffcc"
| 59
| March 9, 1994
| @ Atlanta
| W 90–83
|
|
|
| The Omni
| 40–19
|- align="center" bgcolor="#ccffcc"
| 60
| March 11, 1994
| @ Boston
| W 90–83
|
|
|
| Boston Garden
| 41–19
|- align="center" bgcolor="#ccffcc"
| 61
| March 12, 1994
| Cleveland
| W 96–86
|
|
|
| Madison Square Garden
| 42–19
|- align="center" bgcolor="#ccffcc"
| 62
| March 15, 1994
| Indiana
| W 88–82
|
|
|
| Madison Square Garden
| 43–19
|- align="center" bgcolor="#ccffcc"
| 63
| March 17, 1994
| Milwaukee
| W 105–83
|
|
|
| Madison Square Garden
| 44–19
|- align="center" bgcolor="#ccffcc"
| 64
| March 19, 1994
| Boston
| W 105–91
|
|
|
| Madison Square Garden
| 45–19
|- align="center" bgcolor="#ccffcc"
| 65
| March 22, 1994
| Chicago
| W 87–78
|
|
|
| Madison Square Garden
| 46–19
|- align="center" bgcolor="#ccffcc"
| 66
| March 24, 1994
| @ Minnesota
| W 123–106
|
|
|
| Madison Square Garden
| 47–19
|- align="center" bgcolor="#ccffcc"
| 67
| March 25, 1994
| @ Indiana
| W 85–82
|
|
|
| Market Square Arena
| 48–19
|- align="center" bgcolor="#ccffcc"
| 68
| March 27, 1994
| @ Orlando
| W 111–90
|
|
|
| Orlando Arena
| 49–19
|- align="center" bgcolor="#ccffcc"
| 69
| March 29, 1994
| Charlotte
| W 106–95
|
|
|
| Madison Square Garden
| 50–19

|- align="center" bgcolor="#ccffcc"
| 70
| April 2, 1994
| Miami
| W 110–87
|
|
|
| Madison Square Garden
| 51–19
|- align="center" bgcolor="#ffcccc"
| 71
| April 5, 1994
| @ Miami
| L 86–100
|
|
|
| Miami Arena
| 51–20
|- align="center" bgcolor="#ccffcc"
| 72
| April 7, 1994
| Cleveland
| W 97–94 (OT)
|
|
|
| Madison Square Garden
| 52–20
|- align="center" bgcolor="#ffcccc"
| 73
| April 8, 1994
| @ Philadelphia
| L 97–100
|
|
|
| The Spectrum
| 52–21
|- align="center" bgcolor="#ffcccc"
| 74
| April 10, 1994
| @ New Jersey
| L 88–107
|
|
|
| Brendan Byrne Arena
| 52–22
|- align="center" bgcolor="#ffcccc"
| 75
| April 11, 1994
| Orlando
| L 100–108
|
|
|
| Madison Square Garden
| 52–23
|- align="center" bgcolor="#ccffcc"
| 76
| April 14, 1994
| @ Washington
| W 111–106
|
|
|
| USAir Arena
| 53–23
|- align="center" bgcolor="#ccffcc"
| 77
| April 15, 1994
| Washington
| W 103–90
|
|
|
| Madison Square Garden
| 54–23
|- align="center" bgcolor="#ffcccc"
| 78
| April 17, 1994
| @ Charlotte
| L 91–107
|
|
|
| Charlotte Coliseum
| 54–24
|- align="center" bgcolor="#ffcccc"
| 79
| April 19, 1994
| Atlanta
| L 84–87
|
|
|
| Madison Square Garden
| 54–25
|- align="center" bgcolor="#ccffcc"
| 80
| April 21, 1994
| Philadelphia
| W 130–82
|
|
|
| Madison Square Garden
| 55–25
|- align="center" bgcolor="#ccffcc"
| 81
| April 22, 1994
| @ Milwaukee
| W 125–85
|
|
|
| Bradley Center
| 56–25
|- align="center" bgcolor="#ccffcc"
| 82
| April 24, 1994
| @ Chicago
| W 92–76
|
|
|
| Chicago Stadium
| 57–25

Playoffs

|- align="center" bgcolor="#ccffcc"
| 1
| April 29, 1994
| New Jersey
| W 91–80
| Patrick Ewing (25)
| Patrick Ewing (13)
| Patrick Ewing (5)
| Madison Square Garden19,763
| 1–0
|- align="center" bgcolor="#ccffcc"
| 2
| May 1, 1994
| New Jersey
| W 90–81
| Charles Oakley (25)
| Charles Oakley (24)
| Derek Harper (8)
| Madison Square Garden19,763
| 2–0
|- align="center" bgcolor="#ffcccc"
| 3
| May 4, 1994
| @ New Jersey
| L 92–93 (OT)
| Patrick Ewing (27)
| Charles Oakley (16)
| Harper, Davis (4)
| Brendan Byrne Arena20,049
| 2–1
|- align="center" bgcolor="#ccffcc"
| 4
| May 6, 1994
| @ New Jersey
| W 102–92
| Patrick Ewing (36)
| Patrick Ewing (14)
| Oakley, Starks (4)
| Brendan Byrne Arena20,049
| 3–1
|-

|- align="center" bgcolor="#ccffcc"
| 1
| May 8, 1994
| Chicago
| W 90–86
| Patrick Ewing (18)
| Patrick Ewing (12)
| three players tied (3)
| Madison Square Garden19,763
| 1–0
|- align="center" bgcolor="#ccffcc"
| 2
| May 11, 1994
| Chicago
| W 96–91
| Patrick Ewing (26)
| Anthony Mason (14)
| Anthony Mason (6)
| Madison Square Garden19,763
| 2–0
|- align="center" bgcolor="#ffcccc"
| 3
| May 13, 1994
| @ Chicago
| L 102–104
| Patrick Ewing (34)
| Ewing, Oakley (9)
| John Starks (6)
| Chicago Stadium18,676
| 2–1
|- align="center" bgcolor="#ffcccc"
| 4
| May 15, 1994
| @ Chicago
| L 83–95
| Patrick Ewing (18)
| Charles Oakley (17)
| Anthony, Starks (6)
| Chicago Stadium18,676
| 2–2
|- align="center" bgcolor="#ccffcc"
| 5
| May 18, 1994
| Chicago
| W 87–86
| Patrick Ewing (20)
| Patrick Ewing (13)
| Greg Anthony (8)
| Madison Square Garden19,763
| 3–2
|- align="center" bgcolor="#ffcccc"
| 6
| May 20, 1994
| @ Chicago
| L 79–93
| Patrick Ewing (26)
| Patrick Ewing (14)
| John Starks (7)
| Chicago Stadium18,676
| 3–3
|- align="center" bgcolor="#ccffcc"
| 7
| May 22, 1994
| Chicago
| W 87–77
| Patrick Ewing (18)
| Charles Oakley (20)
| Patrick Ewing (6)
| Madison Square Garden19,763
| 4–3
|-

|- align="center" bgcolor="#ccffcc"
| 1
| May 24, 1994
| Indiana
| W 100–89
| Patrick Ewing (28)
| Charles Oakley (13)
| John Starks (6)
| Madison Square Garden19,763
| 1–0
|- align="center" bgcolor="#ccffcc"
| 2
| May 26, 1994
| Indiana
| W 89–78
| Patrick Ewing (32)
| Patrick Ewing (13)
| Derek Harper (8)
| Madison Square Garden19,763
| 2–0
|- align="center" bgcolor="#ffcccc"
| 3
| May 28, 1994
| @ Indiana
| L 68–88
| Oakley, Starks (12)
| Charles Oakley (9)
| Greg Anthony (4)
| Market Square Arena16,530
| 2–1
|- align="center" bgcolor="#ffcccc"
| 4
| May 30, 1994
| @ Indiana
| L 77–83
| Patrick Ewing (25)
| Charles Oakley (15)
| John Starks (4)
| Market Square Arena16,536
| 2–2
|- align="center" bgcolor="#ffcccc"
| 5
| June 1, 1994
| Indiana
| L 86–93
| Patrick Ewing (29)
| Charles Oakley (13)
| John Starks (8)
| Madison Square Garden
| 2–3
|- align="center" bgcolor="#ccffcc"
| 6
| June 3, 1994
| @ Indiana
| W 98–91
| John Starks (26)
| Patrick Ewing (10)
| John Starks (6)
| Market Square Arena16,529
| 3–3
|- align="center" bgcolor="#ccffcc"
| 7
| June 5, 1994
| Indiana
| W 94–90
| Patrick Ewing (24)
| Patrick Ewing (22)
| Patrick Ewing (7)
| Madison Square Garden19,763
| 4–3
|-

|- align="center" bgcolor="#ffcccc"
| 1
| June 8, 1994
| @ Houston
| L 78–85
| Patrick Ewing (23)
| Charles Oakley (14)
| Derek Harper (5)
| The Summit16,611
| 0–1
|- align="center" bgcolor="#ccffcc"
| 2
| June 10, 1994
| @ Houston
| W 91–83
| John Starks (19)
| Patrick Ewing (13)
| John Starks (9)
| The Summit16,611
| 1–1
|- align="center" bgcolor="#ffcccc"
| 3
| June 12, 1994
| Houston
| L 89–93
| Derek Harper (21)
| Patrick Ewing (13)
| John Starks (9)
| Madison Square Garden19,763
| 1–2
|- align="center" bgcolor="#ccffcc"
| 4
| June 15, 1994
| Houston
| W 91–82
| Derek Harper (21)
| Charles Oakley (20)
| Derek Harper (5)
| Madison Square Garden19,763
| 2–2
|- align="center" bgcolor="#ccffcc"
| 5
| June 17, 1994
| Houston
| W 91–84
| Patrick Ewing (25)
| Patrick Ewing (22)
| Derek Harper (7)
| Madison Square Garden19,763
| 3–2
|- align="center" bgcolor="#ffcccc"
| 6
| June 19, 1994
| @ Houston
| L 84–86
| John Starks (27)
| Patrick Ewing (15)
| Derek Harper (10)
| The Summit16,611
| 3–3
|- align="center" bgcolor="#ffcccc"
| 7
| June 22, 1994
| @ Houston
| L 84–90
| Derek Harper (23)
| Charles Oakley (14)
| Derek Harper (5)
| The Summit16,611
| 3–4
|-

Player statistics

NOTE: Please write players statistics in alphabetical order by last name.

Season

Playoffs

Media

Television

Some New York Knicks TV games carried on MSG 2 because of broadcast conflict with the New York Rangers (NHL).

Radio

Some New York Knicks radio games carried on WEVD because of broadcast conflict with the New York Jets (NFL) and the New York Rangers (NHL).

Awards and records

Awards
Charles Oakley, NBA All-Defensive First Team

Records

Milestones

Transactions

Trades

Free agents

Player Transactions Citation:

See also
1993–94 NBA season

References

 Knicks on Database Basketball
 Knicks on Basketball Reference

New York Knicks seasons
Eastern Conference (NBA) championship seasons
New York Knicks
New York Knicks
New York Knick
1990s in Manhattan
Madison Square Garden